Henry James Bond (27 May 1869 – 27 November 1946) was an  Australian rules footballer who played with St Kilda in the Victorian Football League (VFL).

References

External links 

1869 births
1946 deaths
Australian rules footballers from Victoria (Australia)
St Kilda Football Club players
Footscray Football Club (VFA) players